I-League 2, officially known as the Hero 2nd Division League for sponsorship ties with Hero MotoCorp, is an Indian men's professional football league. It is the 3rd tier of Indian football, behind the Indian Super League and the I-League. It operates as a system of promotion and relegation with the I-League, and provisional relegation with the Indian State Leagues. 

The 2nd Division League was introduced from the 2008 season, having been preceded by NFL 2nd Division. State FA's nominate teams who have finished at the top of their respective state leagues (or passing the required criteria). They are later to be approved by the AIFF to participate in the league or consequent qualifiers, regarding the number of nominations.

History
I-League 2nd Division was introduced during the 2008 season, with first game  played on 25 March between Mohammedan Sporting and Amity United.

That season saw Mohammedan Sporting, Mumbai, Vasco and Chirag United promoted to I-League. The next season saw Pune, Shillong Lajong, Viva Kerala and Salgaocar getting promoted.

Since 2010, only top 2 teams were promoted to I-League. ONGC and HAL in that year, in 2011 Shillong Lajong and Sporting Clube de Goa, with Lajong being promoted for the second time, while in 2012 ONGC and United Sikkim were promoted for upcoming season. The 2013 season saw Rangdajied United FC and Mohammedan qualifying for I-League.

In 2014, only one team got promoted from the 2nd Division, and similarly only one team got relegated from 2013–14 season.

In 2016, again only one team was promoted from the 2nd division (Aizawl F.C.), and only one was relegated from I-League (Dempo).

Due to the covid pandemic, the traditional final round format was scrapped in 2020. It was decided that the league will be rescheduled into a new format and all  non-reserve teams from the preliminary stage will automatically progress to this round. It was officially named as I-League Qualifiers.
After making I-League the second division of Indian football, to avoid confusion AIFF decided to rename 2nd Division to I-league 2.

Competition format

2008–2015
Previously, the league was formatted as a neutral venue competition with teams split into groups in which all the groups play in one stadium each. The final round is contested in a double round-robin format, after which the top two teams get promoted to the I-League.

2015–2017
The I-League core committee approved the plans for the 2015–2016 I-League 2nd division matches to be played on a home and away basis. The preliminary rounds will be played as the conference system with the teams being divided into Eastern and Western conferences. Top 3 teams from each conference will qualify for the final round of the 2015–2016 season of 2nd division I-League.

To widen the football map of the country and to bolster the football structure, I-League committee decide to launch the 2nd division qualifier for 2016–2017 season. Participants from all the state associations would be invited to take part in 2nd division 2016–17 qualifiers. The state associations need to nominate two teams with best results, apart from the teams who would compete in Hero I-League and 2nd division league, from the state leagues to compete in the 2nd division qualifiers. The teams will fight it out amongst themselves in the zonal round followed by the final round. Eventually top two teams from the final round will get a nod to the 2nd division, provided that they fulfill the club licensing requirements in the due time.

2017–2018
The format was further altered from 2017–2018 season, the league was divided in two stages: the Preliminary and the Final. The tournament will also feature reserve teams of Indian Super League clubs. In the preliminary stage, 18 teams are divided into three groups where all matches would be played on a home and away basis. The winners of each group plus the best second-placed team would qualify for the final round. However, if reserve teams of ISL clubs finishes as winners or runners-up in any group, the position is passed on onto the next non-ISL team. The final round will be played at a central venue, the winners of which would be promoted to the next tier of Indian Football.

2018–2019
Sixteen teams were allowed to participate in this season by the league committee.

2021
A new format was introduced named as I-league Qualifiers. 10 teams promoted from state leagues battled for I-league qualification.

2022 - 2023
In a meeting on December 16, 2022, the AIFF League Committee has recommended that States that have conducted their state leagues in 2021-22 (12) will nominate a club each for the Hero I-League 2, with six reserve teams of the Hero ISL clubs will also join them for the league. A pre-tournament qualifier will be held for the teams from states that have not conducted their leagues in 2021-22, from which the top two teams will gain entry into the Hero I-League 2, bringing the total number of clubs in the league to 20.

These 20 teams, would be divided into the four groups of five and will play each other in a round-robin home and away format. The group winners, along with the best second-placed team, will play in the Final Round, which will be a single-leg round robin format competition.

Clubs

All time clubs

Relegated teams (from I-League to I-League 2nd Division)

Sponsorship & media coverage

Sponsorships
From 2008 to 2011 the league was sponsored by Oil and Natural Gas Corporation (ONGC) and was named the ONGC I-League 2nd Division. ONGC was also the title sponsor of the I-League. In October 2011 ONGC was dropped as a sponsor.

Broadcasters

Head coaches

Winning coaches

Champions

Players

Top scorers

Awards

The trophy

Prize money
As updated on 28 February 2018

Season awards

See also
 Football in India
 History of Indian football
 List of football clubs in India
 Indian Women's League
 NFL Second Division
 NFL Third Division
 Santosh Trophy

References

 
Professional sports leagues in India
3
2
Sports leagues established in 2008
Sports leagues in India
Third level football leagues in Asia